Cesar Enrique Aguinaldo Virata  (born 12 December 1930) is a Filipino former statesman and businessman who was the fourth Prime Minister of the Philippines from 1981 to 1986. He is currently the corporate vice chairman of the Rizal Commercial Banking Corporation. He is the eponym of the Cesar Virata School of Business, the business school of the University of the Philippines Diliman.

Government service

Finance minister 
He served as Finance Minister from 1970 to 1986 under President Ferdinand Marcos.

Prime Minister of the Philippines 

Virata served as Prime Minister of the Philippines from 1981 to 1986 under the Interim Batasang Pambansa and the Regular Batasang Pambansa, concurrently with his position as Finance Minister. 
He also headed the National Economic and Development Authority (NEDA), the country's highest economic planning body, while also serving as the Prime Minister. Virata was the third to occupy the position and was succeeded by economist Vicente Valdepeñas, Jr.

After the 1986 EDSA Revolution 
He was replaced as Prime Minister in the aftermath of the 1986 People Power Revolution by Salvador Laurel. Laurel succeeded Virata as Prime Minister on 25 February 1986, through the appointment of Corazon Aquino, but the position was abolished a month later by Proclamation No. 3 (the 'Freedom Constitution'). The office was confirmed as superseded by the 1987 Constitution, which again fused the offices of the head of state and the head of government in the President.

Academe
Prior to assuming leadership positions in the government service during the Marcos administration, Virata used to teach at the business school of the University of the Philippines Diliman. He served as dean of the College of Business Administration, which was named after him on April 12, 2013 by the University of the Philippines Board of Regents  (BOR) as the Cesar E.A. Virata School of Business. Several interest groups, including U.P. Kilos Na, have protested this renaming of the business school, and the BOR decided to restudy its decision during its board meeting held last July 29, 2013. Some members in certain interest groups, including U.P. Kilos Na, the UP Diliman University Council, undergraduates of the UP College of Business, and in the BOR itself then objected to renaming the business school after Virata. The matter was discussed at length in a series of meetings which resulted in the BOR re-affirming its decision to rename the college after Virata.

Family and personal life
Virata is married to Phylita Joy Gamboa, a popular stage actress, and has three children: Steven Cesar, a businessman; Gillian Joyce, an educator; and Michael Dean, a doctor specializing in infectious diseases. The grandnephew of the first President, Emilio Aguinaldo, Virata holds an MBA from the Wharton School of the University of Pennsylvania. Virata is also an accomplished tennis player. His uncle, Leonides Sarao Virata, also served during under Marcos as Secretary of Trade and Industry and chairman of the Development Bank of the Philippines. As with most of his family, Virata is a member of the Philippine Independent Church.

Biographies
Virata's life and his impact on Philippine economic history have been the subject of various books.  The most of extensive biography to cover Virata as its main subject is Gerardo Sicat's 2014 biography, "Cesar Virata: Life and Times Through Four Decades of Philippine Economic History." He is also one of the main subjects of Teresa S. Encarnacion Tadem's 2019 Ateneo Press book "Philippine Politics and the Marcos Technocrats: The Emergence and Evolution of a Power Elite."

Honors
 Grand Cordon of the Order of the Rising Sun (2016)
Most Distinguished Brother, Pan Xenia International Professional Foreign Trade Fraternity

See also
Prime Minister of the Philippines
National Economic and Development Authority (Prime Minister was also the head of the NEDA)
 Gerardo P. Sicat, 2014. Cesar Virata Life and Times Through Four Decades of Philippine Economic History, Diliman, Quezon City: The University of Philippines Press, .

References

1930 births
Living people
Aguinaldo family
Prime Ministers of the Philippines
Members of the Philippine Independent Church
Directors-General of the National Economic and Development Authority of the Philippines
Secretaries of Finance of the Philippines
Members of the House of Representatives of the Philippines from Cavite
People from Kawit, Cavite
Wharton School of the University of Pennsylvania alumni
Ferdinand Marcos administration cabinet members
Members of the Batasang Pambansa